In the domain of mathematics known as representation theory, pure spinors (or simple spinors) are spinors that are annihilated under the Clifford action by a maximal isotropic subspace of the space
 of vectors with respect to the scalar product determining the Clifford algebra.  
They were introduced by Élie Cartan  
in the 1930s to classify complex structures.  
Pure spinors were a key ingredient in the study of spin geometry and twistor theory,
introduced by Roger Penrose in the 1960s.

Definition
Consider a complex vector space  with either even complex dimension 
 or odd complex dimension  and a  nondegenerate complex scalar product 
, with values  on pairs of vectors .  
The Clifford algebra  is the quotient of the full tensor  algebra 

Spinors are modules of the Clifford algebra, and so in particular there is an action of the
The complex subspace  that annihilates 
a given nonzero spinor  has dimension . If   then  is said to be a pure spinor.

Projective pure spinors
Conversely, given a maximal isotropic subspace it is possible to determine the pure spinor that it annihilates it up to multiplication by a complex number. Pure spinors defined up to projectivization are called projective pure spinors. For  of dimension , the space of projective pure spinors is the homogeneous space

As shown by Cartan, pure spinors are uniquely determined by the fact that they satisfy a set of homogeneous quadratic equations on the standard irreducible spinor module, the Cartan relations, which determine the image of maximal isotropic subspaces of the vector space  under the Cartan map. In 7 dimensions, or fewer, all spinors are pure. In 8 dimensions there is a single pure spinor constraint. In 10 dimensions, there are 10 constraints

where  are the Gamma matrices that represent the vectors 
in  that generate the Clifford algebra. It was shown by Cartan that there are, in general,

quadratic relations, signifying the vanishing of the quadratic forms with values in the exterior spaces  for
 

corresponding to these skew symmetric elements of the Clifford algebra.

in the  dimensional case and

in the  dimensional case.

Pure spinors in string theory

Pure spinors were introduced in string quantization  by Nathan Berkovits.
Nigel Hitchin introduced generalized Calabi–Yau manifolds, where the generalized complex structure is defined by a pure spinor.  These spaces describe the geometry of flux compactifications in string theory.

References

 Cartan, Élie.  Lecons sur la Theorie des Spineurs, Paris, Hermann (1937).
 Chevalley, Claude. The algebraic theory of spinors and Clifford Algebras.  Collected Works.  Springer Verlag (1996).
 Charlton, Philip. The geometry of pure spinors, with applications, PhD thesis (1997).

Spinors